In Major League Baseball (MLB), a game seven can occur in the World Series or in a League Championship Series (LCS), which are contested as best-of-seven series. Based on the playoffs format arrangement, game seven—when necessary—is played in the ballpark of the team holding home-field advantage for the series.

Since the  season, they have used a best-of-seven format, except for 1994 as noted above.

A game seven cannot occur in earlier rounds of the MLB postseason, as Division Series and Wild Card rounds use shorter series.

Key

All-time game sevens

All-time standings

Reoccurring game seven matchups

References

Game Seven
Game Seven